Kristin Sunde is a Democratic member of the Iowa House of Representatives, representing District 42 since 2019.

Political career

Sunde was elected to the Iowa House of Representatives in 2018, defeating District 42 incumbent Peter Cownie. She currently sits on the following committees:
 Human Resources
 Public Safety
 Transportation

Sunde endorsed Pete Buttigieg in the 2020 Democratic presidential primaries.

Electoral record

References

Living people
Politicians from Saint Paul, Minnesota
People from West Des Moines, Iowa
University of Northern Iowa alumni
Women state legislators in Iowa
Democratic Party members of the Iowa House of Representatives
Year of birth missing (living people)
21st-century American politicians
21st-century American women politicians